The Athletics at the 2016 Summer Paralympics – Women's 1500 metres T13 event at the 2016 Paralympic Games took place on 10 September 2016, at the Estádio Olímpico João Havelange.

Heats

Heat 1 
11:30 8 September 2016:

Heat 2 
11:39 8 September 2016:

Final 
11:13 10 September 2016:

Notes

Athletics at the 2016 Summer Paralympics